Simen Østensen (born 4 August 1984) is a Norwegian cross-country skier. He skis with the club Fossum IF.

He finished third in the 2006-07 Tour de Ski. Before that, Østensen had started in a World Cup race only once (the 50 km in Holmenkollen in 2005, where he did not finish) before.

Østensen won the test event in the team sprint at Liberec, Czech Republic on 17 February 2008.

Cross-country skiing results
All results are sourced from the International Ski Federation (FIS).

World Championships

World Cup

Season standings

Individual podiums

 3 podiums (1 , 2 )

Team podiums

 2 victories – (1 , 1 ) 
 3 podiums – (2 ,  1)

References

External links

1984 births
Living people
Sportspeople from Bærum
Tour de Ski skiers
Norwegian male cross-country skiers